Thetis was launched in 1793 in Rotherhithe. She spent most of her career as a West Indiaman. She spent several years as a government transport, and then between 1830 and 1836 she made two voyages as a whaler in the Britishsouthern whale fisheryy. She returned to trading to the western hemisphere, and was last listed in 1842.


Career
Thetis first appeared in Lloyd's Register (LR) in 1793.

1st whaling voyage (1830–1832): Captain A.Gray (or Grey), sailed from England on 29 June 1830. Thetis was reported to have been on the Japan Grounds, and at Honolulu. She arrived back at England on 26 May 1832.

2nd whaling voyage (1832–1836): Captain Apsey sailed from London on 16 October 1832. Thetis was reported at Bay of Islands (1833 and 1834), Honolulu (1834), Sunda Strait (1835), and Bay of Islands again (1835). She arrived back in London on 20 May 1836.

On or prior to her return, Somes sold Thetis. Aspey, after his return, went on to captain , another vessel that Somes owned, sailing her on a whaling voyage to New Zealand.

Fate
Last listed in 1842 with data unchanged since 1839.

Citations

References
 

1793 ships
Age of Sail merchant ships of England
Whaling ships